Hanna Wallach (born 1979) is a computational social scientist and partner research manager at Microsoft Research. Her work makes use of machine learning models to study the dynamics of social processes. Her current research focuses on issues of fairness, accountability, transparency, and ethics as they relate to AI and machine learning.

Early life and education 
Wallach was an undergraduate student at the University of Cambridge, where she specialised in computer science. She moved to the University of Edinburgh for her graduate studies. Here she focussed on cognitive science and machine learning. Wallach completed her doctoral research at the University of Cambridge. Her research considered language models.

Career 
Her early research considered the development of natural language processing which analyses the structure and content of social processes. Wallach explained that social interactions have several things in common; structure (i.e. who is involved in the interaction), content (the information that is shared during or arises from these interactions) and dynamics (the structure and content can change over time). She worked alongside journalists and computer scientists to better understand how organisations function. In 2007 she joined the University of Massachusetts Amherst, where she was made Assistant Professor in 2010.

At Microsoft Research Wallach investigates fairness and transparency in machine learning. In 2020 she worked with machine learning practitioners from across the tech sector to create an artificial intelligence ethics checklist. The checklist aimed to provide clear guidelines for the ethical development of artificial intelligence systems.

Awards and honours 

 2001 Science, Engineering & Technology Student of the Year
 2002 University of Edinburgh Best MSc Student in Cognitive Science
 2010 Best Paper Award at the International Conference on Artificial Intelligence and Statistics
 2014 Glamour magazine 35 Women Under 35 Who Are Changing the Tech Industry
 2015 Elected to the International Machine Learning Society's Board of Trustees
 2016 AnitaB.org Early Career Award
 2018 Program Chair for the Conference on Neural Information Processing Systems
 2019 General Chair for the Conference on Neural Information Processing Systems

Selected publications

Personal life 
Wallach is a competitive roller derby player. She is an advocate for the improved representation of women working in computer science. She was co-founder of the now annual Women in Machine Learning workshop, Debian Women Project and GNOME Outreach Program for Women (now Outreachy).

References 

1979 births
Alumni of the University of Cambridge
Alumni of the University of Edinburgh
American computer scientists
American women computer scientists
Computer scientists
Living people
Machine learning researchers
Roller derby skaters
University of Massachusetts Amherst faculty
Women computer scientists
Natural language processing researchers
Data miners
American women academics
21st-century American women